Dan Gitlin is an American Film Editor based in Los Angeles.

Film career 
Gitlin is the supervising editor of American Epic, a body of work exploring the early history of American recorded music. He is primarily known for his work with film director Bernard MacMahon, with whom he has edited four films to date, and works as an editor with Lo-Max Films and Paradise Pictures.

Gitlin was the supervising editor of the three films that comprise the American Epic trilogy; American Epic: The Big Bang, American Epic: Blood and Soil, and American Epic: Out Of The Many The One. He also edited The American Epic Sessions, a musical film featuring many top contemporary artists  including Alabama Shakes, The Americans, The Avett Brothers, Beck, Frank Fairfield, Ana Gabriel, Rhiannon Giddens, Merle Haggard, Bobby Ingano, Elton John, Pokey LaFarge, Bettye LaVette, Los Lobos, Lost Bayou Ramblers, Taj Mahal, Steve Martin & Edie Brickell, Fred Martin & The Levite Camp, Ashley Monroe, Nas, Willie Nelson, Blind Boy Paxton, Raphael Saadiq and Jack White.

Films he has worked on have been selected for a number of film festivals including: The American Epic Sessions at the BFI London Film Festival 2015, The American Epic Sessions at IDFA 2015, American Epic: The Big Bang at IDFA 2015, American Epic: Out Of The Many The One at the Hawaiian International Film Festival where it was nominated for the Halekulani Golden Orchid Award, American Epic: Out of the Many the One at Sydney Film Festival where it won the Foxtel Audience Award, to great acclaim at the North American Premiere at the SXSW Film Festival 2016 and the Sundance Film Festival on 28th Jan 2016 where Robert Redford  presented the USA premiere of American Epic at The Eccles. The Sundance special event was produced by Allison McGourty, and featured an introduction by Sundance founder Robert Redford, a screening of excerpts from the American Epic films, and a Q&A, hosted by Peter Golub of The Sundance Institute, with MacMahon, Taj Mahal, Jack White and T Bone Burnett. This was followed by performances by Taj Mahal and The Avett Brothers.

Filmography 

The American Epic Sessions (2017)
American Epic: The Big Bang (2017)
American Epic: Blood and Soil (2017)
American Epic: Out Of the Many The One (2017)

Awards and honors

Early career 

Prior to his career working with Lo-Max Films and Paradise Pictures, Gitlin was an assistant editor and online editor at the Westside Media Group in Los Angeles.

References

External links 

 IMdB link
 American Epic official website

American film editors
People from San Francisco
Living people
1983 births
People from Los Angeles
American television editors